Gråhyrnerene  (Gråhyrneran) is a mountain in the municipality of  Ål in Viken, Norway.

References

Ål
Mountains of Viken